"Incredible" is the third single by English duo the Shapeshifters, released on 6 March 2006. It became their third consecutive top-20 single, peaking at number 12 on the UK Singles Chart, but remained in the top 75 for only four more weeks. It charted higher in Finland, where it debuted at number two and stayed in the top 20 for two more weeks; it is the band's highest-charting single there.

Charts

Release history

References

2006 singles
2006 songs
British songs
Positiva Records singles